Michael Donth (born 8 June 1967) is a German politician of the Christian Democratic Union (CDU) who has been serving as a member of the Bundestag from the state of Baden-Württemberg, Germany, since 2013.

Political career 
Donth became a member of the Bundestag in the 2013 German federal election, representing the Reutlingen district. He is a member of the Committee on Transport and Digital Infrastructure and the Committee on Tourism.

In addition to his committee assignments, Donth is part of the German-French Parliamentary Friendship Group; the German Parliamentary Friendship Group for Relations with the States of Central America; and the German Parliamentary Friendship Group for Relations with the States of South Asia. Since 2022, he has been chairing a cross-party group in support of UNESCO-recognized nature reserves.

In the negotiations to form a coalition government under the leadership of Minister-President of Baden-Württemberg Winfried Kretschmann following the 2021 state elections, Donth was a member of the working group on mobility, co-chaired by Winfried Hermann and Thomas Dörflinger.

Other activities 
 Federal Network Agency for Electricity, Gas, Telecommunications, Posts and Railway (BNetzA), Alternate Member of the Rail Infrastructure Advisory Council

Political positions 
In June 2017, Donth voted against Germany's introduction of same-sex marriage.

Ahead of the 2021 national elections, Donth endorsed Markus Söder as the Christian Democrats' joint candidate to succeed Chancellor Angela Merkel.

References

External links 

  
 Bundestag biography 

1967 births
Living people
Members of the Bundestag for Baden-Württemberg
Members of the Bundestag 2021–2025
Members of the Bundestag 2017–2021
Members of the Bundestag 2013–2017
Members of the Bundestag for the Christian Democratic Union of Germany